Fern Creek may refer to several places:
Fern Creek, Louisville, a neighborhood of Louisville, Kentucky
Fern Creek, a California stream that flows from the Sierra Crest to Mono Lake
Fern Creek (Alberta), a stream in Canada